The Northfleet was a British full-rigged ship that is best remembered for her disastrous sinking in the English Channel in January 1873.

Description
She was built at Northfleet, Kent in 1853 for London shipowner Duncan Dunbar and spent much of her career trading between England and Australia and between England, India and China.

Sinking
In 1872 the ship was owned by John Patton, Jr., of London when she was chartered to carry labourers and their families, 340 tons of iron rails, and 240 tons of other equipment to build a railway line in Tasmania, under the command of her previous chief officer Captain Edward Knowles (born on 4 May 1839).

The Northfleet left Gravesend for Hobart on 13 January 1873 with 379 persons on board: the pilot, 34 crew, three cabin passengers and the assisted emigrants comprising 248 men, 42 women and 52 children. Bad weather forced the ship to drop anchor at several points before leaving the Channel and on the night of 22 January she was at anchor about two or three miles (5 km) off Dungeness. Around 10.30 p.m. she was run down by a steamer that backed off and disappeared into the darkness. The heavily laden Northfleet sank within half an hour, before vessels in the vicinity realised anything was amiss, and in the ensuing panic a total of 293 people were drowned. 86 were saved. Of the women on board only the captain's wife and one emigrant survived, along with just two of the children. Only two boats managed to get clear of the sinking ship, one without any oars and the other damaged. The captain went down with his ship.

The offending steamer proved to be the Spanish steamship Murillo, which was stopped off Dover on 22 September 1873, eight months after the collision. A Court of Admiralty condemned her to be sold and severely censured her officers.

Sources

Basil Lubbock, The Blackwall Frigates, Brown, Son & Ferguson, Glasgow, 1924. 
Lloyd's Register of Shipping.
The Loss of the Ship Northfleet, Waterlow and Sons, London, 1873
Cassell’s Illustrated History of England (c.1885) v.10, pp. 40–42.

External links
 

Victorian-era merchant ships of the United Kingdom
Shipwrecks in the English Channel
Maritime incidents in January 1873
Ships sunk in collisions
Maritime disasters in Kent
Ships built in Northfleet
1853 ships